Giant's Causeway (14 February 1997 – 16 April 2018) was an American-bred, Irish-trained Thoroughbred racehorse who won five Group One races in Britain and Ireland as a three-year-old in 2000: the St James's Palace Stakes, Eclipse Stakes, Sussex Stakes, Juddmonte International Stakes and Irish Champion Stakes. He was named the 2000 Cartier Horse of the Year. The horse was sent to stud and proved to be an outstanding sire.

Nicknamed the "Iron Horse" on account of his toughness and constitution, Giant's Causeway was hailed by his trainer Aidan O'Brien as a "true champion".

Background
Giant's Causeway was a chestnut horse with a white blaze. He was bred in Kentucky by Coolmore Stud and Michael Tabor. His sire Storm Cat was the 1999 and 2000 leading sire in North America, and his dam Mariah's Storm also produced Freud, the 2008 leading sire in New York.

Racing career

1999: Two-year-old season
As a two-year-old in 1999, Giant's Causeway was unbeaten in three races: a maiden race at Naas, the Futurity Stakes at the Curragh and the Prix de la Salamandre at Longchamp.

2000: Three-year-old season
In the spring of 2000, Giant's Causeway won the Gladness Stakes at the Curragh and then finished second in both the 2000 Guineas and the Irish 2000 Guineas.

He then won five straight Group One races: the St. James's Palace Stakes at Royal Ascot, the Eclipse Stakes at Sandown Park, the Sussex Stakes at Goodwood, the Juddmonte International Stakes at York and the Irish Champion Stakes at Leopardstown.

His winning sequence was broken in the Queen Elizabeth II Stakes at Ascot on 23 September, when he was beaten half a length by Observatory. On his final racecourse appearance, Giant's Causeway was sent to the United States to contest the Breeders' Cup Classic at Churchill Downs in which he raced on dirt for the first time. Starting at odds of 7.6/1, he was beaten only a neck into second place by the American colt Tiznow.

Giant's Causeway's performances in 2000 earned him European Horse of the Year honours.

Retirement and Breeding Career
In 2001, Giant's Causeway started his stud career at Coolmore Stud in Ireland. He stood one season there before relocating to Coolmore's United States branch Ashford Stud in Versailles, Kentucky. He was a great success at stud, becoming one of the most influential sires in North America. In 2006, he stood for a fee of $300,000.

Giant's Causeway died at the Ashford Stud on 16 April 2018 after a "brief illness" at the age of 21.

Notable Progeny
Giant Causeway's notable descendants include:

c = colt, f = filly

Pedigree

References

 Giant's Causeway's pedigree and stats
 Giant's Causeway in the Stallion Register

External links
 Career 1-2-3 Colour Chart – Giant's Causeway

1997 racehorse births
2018 racehorse deaths
Racehorses bred in Kentucky
Racehorses trained in Ireland
United States Champion Thoroughbred Sires
Thoroughbred family 11
Chefs-de-Race